Book of Secrets may refer to:

Books
The Book of Mysteries, also known as The Book of Secrets, a 1st-century BCE Essene text found among the Dead Sea Scrolls
The Book of Mysteries (Manichaeism), also known as The Book of Secrets, a 3rd-century religious text, one of the Seven Scriptures of Manichaeism
The Book of Secrets (novel), 1994 novel by M. G. Vassanji
Books of secrets, compilations of technical and medicinal recipes and magic formulae, published in the 16th–18th centuries
Sefer ha-Razim (The Book of Secrets), a Jewish mystical text
The Book of Secrets, 1974 book series by Rajneesh
 Ketabe Serr (The Book of Secrets), by Muhammad ibn Zakariya al-Razi (9th–10th centuries)

Music
Book of Secrets (album), 1998 album by Balance of Power 
The Book of Secrets, 1997 album by Loreena McKennitt

Film
The Secret Book, 2006 Macedonian detective film directed by Vlado Cvetanovski
National Treasure: Book of Secrets, 2007 film directed by Jon Turteltaub

Television
America's Book of Secrets, a program broadcast by History TV channel